Emilio Duhart Harosteguy (1917 in Temuco – January 2, 2006 in Ustaritz, Labort) was a Chilean architect, representative of modern architecture and considered to be one of the most relevant urbanists of the 20th century.

Duhart's work was profoundly influenced by Le Corbusier's and Walter Gropius' theories, with whom he collaborated in several projects.

Biography

Youth 
Emilio Duhart's family immigrated from the French province of Labort, in the French Basque Country, to southern Chile. He lived in France during his infancy and basic education.

He started a relationship with Raquel Echeverría, who would later become his wife; they had four children and several grandchildren.

Professional career 

In 1935, Duhart started his Architecture studies at the Pontifical Catholic University of Chile (PCUC), and graduated in 1941. In the same year he started working on rural populations in Chillán, affected by the 1939 earthquake.

In 1942 he moved to the United States, where he studied Architecture at Harvard University. In 1943 he graduated under the supervision of architects Walter Gropius and John M. Gauss. He later served as Gropius' assistant and as Konrad Waschmann's assistant at General Panel Corporation Prefabricated Housing. During this stay at Harvard, Duhart became acquainted with the Modern Architecture movement that would become a cornerstone in his career.

Career in Chile 

Duhart returned to Chile at some point in the 40s, he worked along Sergio Larraín García-Moreno— founder of the Chilean Museum of Precolumbian Art,— in several architectural projects: housing, industrial buildings and urban planning, among others.

Besides his work as an architect, Duhart also worked in academia and union matters. In 1946 he was elected counselor at the National College of Architects in Chile, and in 1951 he returned to the PCUC to work as a teacher where he would later become director of the Urbanism, Housing and Planning department.

In 1952 Duhart received a scholarship at the Institut d'Urbanisme in the Sorbonne University, and during his stay he worked with Le Corbusier in several architectural projects at the Indian cities of Ahmedabad and Chandigarh. Duhart also studied at the Centre Technique du Bâtiment, in Paris.

References

Bibliography

External links 
 Photographic Repository of Chilean Architecture

1917 births
2006 deaths
Chilean architects
Harvard Graduate School of Design alumni
Pontifical Catholic University of Chile alumni